Kunstforum International is a bi-monthly magazine for contemporary art. Every issue has about 350 pages with a first part on a specific theme and in-depth articles on contemporary art, a part with interviews with artists and art professionals, a part with exhibition reviews, and essays.

History
The magazine was established in 1973 in Cologne by Dieter Bechtloff and published in book-like form.

References

External links 
 

1973 establishments in West Germany
Bi-monthly magazines published in Germany
Contemporary art magazines
German-language magazines
Magazines established in 1973
Mass media in Cologne
Visual arts magazines published in Germany